The Société Zodiac company, and its predecessor company Mallet, Mélandri et de Pitray, were a manufacturer of non-rigid airships and one rigid airship in the early 1900s and during World War I. The companies were co-founded by Maurice Mallet and Henry de La Vaulx in 1896. During World War I, the company specialized in producing small airships that could be easily deflated, compacted and transported via horse carts. The company also manufactured war planes. After the war the company shifted from airships and airplanes to producing a popular line of inflatable boats for military and civil markets, and aerospace production.

Pre-World War I airships (1906-1913) 
Source: D'Orcy's Airship Manual

See also 
French blimps operated by the USN

References

External links 

 Zodiac Aerospace company website (English)

France Zodiac airships
Airships of France
Airships of the United States Navy
Aviation in France
Aviation history of France
French military-related lists
French military aviation

fr:Zodiac Marine and Pool#Histoire